José Benítez (born 9 July 1949) is a Puerto Rican sailor. He competed in the 470 event at the 1976 Summer Olympics.

References

External links
 

1949 births
Living people
Puerto Rican male sailors (sport)
Olympic sailors of Puerto Rico
Sailors at the 1976 Summer Olympics – 470
Place of birth missing (living people)
20th-century Puerto Rican people